ICPF may refer to:

 Inter Collegiate Prayer Fellowship, a Christian campus group which is spread across 19 countries
 Institute of Chemical Process Fundamentals, one of the six institutes belonging to the ASCR chemical sciences section
 International Commission on Peace and Food, private non-governmental initiative to bring an end to the arms race